Red is the second EP by the band Weekend. The EP was released on September 20, 2011, from Slumberland Records.

Release
Slumberland Records released Red EP in September 2011 with catalog number SLR 157 on compact disc, 12" vinyl, and to digital retailers. The first pressings were colored red. Limited edition pressings came on clear vinyl with gold splatter.

Reception
Metacritic gave Red a "generally favorable" score of 74 out of 100 based on five professional reviews.

Track listing
 "Sweet Sixteen" - 4:20
 "Hazel" - 3:51
 "Your Own Nothing" - 4:13
 "The One You Want" - 3:31
 "Golfers" - 5:57

References

EPs by American artists
2011 EPs